Swammerdamia is a genus of moths of the family Yponomeutidae.

Species
Swammerdamia aulosema - Meyrick, 1932 
Swammerdamia beirnei - Doganlar, 1979 
Swammerdamia caesiella - Hübner, 1796 
Swammerdamia castaneae - Busck, 1914 
Swammerdamia cerasiella - Hübner, 1816 
Swammerdamia compunctella - Herrich-Schäffer, 1855 
Swammerdamia cuprescens - Braun, 1918 
Swammerdamia maculatella - Turati, 1930 
Swammerdamia moensis - Strand, 1920 
Swammerdamia passerella - Zett.
Swammerdamia pyrella - de Villers, 1789 

Yponomeutidae